Rhizogene is a genus of fungi in the family Venturiaceae.

References

External links 

 Rhizogene at Index Fungorum

Venturiaceae